The 2011 MLS SuperDraft was the twelfth annual SuperDraft presented by Major League Soccer.  It was held on January 13, 2011 in Baltimore, Maryland, during the 2011 NSCAA Convention at the Baltimore Convention Center. The 2011 SuperDraft consisted of three rounds with eighteen selections each, for a total of 54 players selected during the draft. The draft preceded the 2011 MLS season.

Changes from 2010 

 As expansion clubs, Vancouver and Portland received the first and second picks in the SuperDraft.
 The SuperDraft has contracted in number of rounds, from four to three, making it the shortest SuperDraft in terms of rounds.

Player selection

54 players were selected during the 3 rounds. Vancouver Whitecaps FC had the first overall selection in the 2011 SuperDraft, followed by Portland Timbers. The following eight selections were from teams that failed to qualify for the 2010 MLS Cup Playoffs, starting with the team holding the lowest amount of 2010 regular season points (3 points per win, one point per draw). The subsequent eight selection positions of clubs were sorted by fewest regular season points, from among teams that went out in the same round of the MLS Cup Playoffs. As similar in other drafts, teams were allowed to trade these rights away to other teams for other rights such as players, special roster spots, or other rights of interest. Participating players in the 2011 draw were confirmed in December 2010.

On January 5, 2011, MLS announced that it was eliminating the previously planned fourth-round of the 2011 SuperDraft and re-introducing a three-round Supplemental Draft.  Previously traded fourth-round 2011 SuperDraft selections became traded first-round 2011 MLS Supplemental Draft selections.

The selection order was released by the league on January 7, 2011.

Any player marked with an * is part of the Generation Adidas program.

Round One

Round One Trades

Round Two

Round Two Trades

Round Three

Round Three Trades

Selections by position

Other Draft Day Trades 
 Los Angeles Galaxy acquired forward Chad Barrett from Toronto FC in exchange for future considerations. Ives Galarcep reported that the future considerations consisted of $125,000 in allocation money and TFC assuming a portion of Barrett's salary.

Trade notes 
 Real Salt Lake acquired midfielder Will Johnson from Chicago Fire in a trade on 22 August 2008. In return, Chicago was to receive a natural fourth-round 2009 MLS SuperDraft selection and a second-round 2011 SuperDraft selection from RSL. However, the trade also contained a clause that allowed Chicago to receive allocation money in lieu of the draft picks.  Chicago chose the allocation money.
 San Jose Earthquakes acquired a conditional 2011 SuperDraft selection and a second-round 2010 MLS SuperDraft selection (#28) from Real Salt Lake in exchange for forward Pablo Campos on July 15, 2009. The conditional 2011 selection was contingent on Campos starting 8 games for Real Salt Lake in 2009. Campos started only 5 games so San Jose did not receive the conditional 2011 draft pick.

Notable undrafted players

Homegrown players

See also 
 2011 MLS Supplemental Draft
 MLS SuperDraft
 Major League Soccer
 Generation Adidas
 Draft (sports)

References 

Major League Soccer drafts
SuperDraft
MLS SuperDraft
2010s in Baltimore
Soccer in Baltimore
Events in Baltimore
MLS SuperDraft